OBS or obs. may refer to:

Organisations
 Office of Boating Safety, the division of Transport Canada responsible for boating safety
 Optus Broadband Satellite, a satellite broadband service offered by the Australian ISP Optus
 Orange Belt Stages, a bus company based in California, US
 Orange Business Services, a worldwide business communications company
 Organization for Black Struggle, an activist organization in St. Louis, Missouri, US 
 Coop Obs!, a chain of hypermarkets in Norway, formerly known as Obs
 Outward Bound School; See Outward Bound
 Outward Bound Singapore, part of the network of Outward Bound centres
 Océ Business Services, the outsourcing business of Océ
 Oporto British School, a school in northern Portugal

Science and technology
Obsolete Battle Show, an object show that contains lore. 3rd season of calculated battlegrounds
 Organic brain syndrome, a medical condition resulting from brain injury
 Omnidirectional bearing selector, an aircraft navigation instrument; See VHF omnidirectional range
 Obstetrics and gynaecology, commonly abbreviated Obs/Gyn
 Ocean-bottom seismometer, a seismic tool to record earthquakes underwater
Old Body Style, a style of GM pickup trucks manufactured between 1988 and 2000

Computing
 OBS Studio, an open source streaming and recording program
 Open Build Service, a software distribution development platform
 Optical burst switching, a switching technology in optical networks

Television, film, and music
 One Buck Short, a punk-rock band from Kuala Lumpur, Malaysia
 "Orange Blossom Special" (song), bluegrass song written by Ervin T. Rouse

Broadcasters
 OBS (South Korean broadcaster), a broadcast television station based in Bucheon, Gyeonggi-do, South Korea
 Oita Broadcasting System, a broadcasting station in Ōita Prefecture, Japan
 Olympic Broadcasting Services, an organization responsible for the broadcast of the Olympic Games since 2010 Vancouver Winter Games

Publications
 OBS! (magazine), Swedish business and political magazine
 L'Obs, French news magazine
 On Basilisk Station, the first novel in David Weber's Honor Harrington series

Business
 Off-balance-sheet, financing activity not on the company's balance sheet
 Organisation breakdown structure, a global hierarchy that represents the different levels of responsibility within a project or enterprise

Other uses
 Operation Blue Star
 Original British Standard, a bullhead rail profile

See also
 OBSS (disambiguation)